Park Yeong-suk (born 24 January 1947) is a South Korean athlete. She competed in the women's discus throw at the 1964 Summer Olympics.

References

1947 births
Living people
Athletes (track and field) at the 1964 Summer Olympics
South Korean female discus throwers
Olympic athletes of South Korea
Place of birth missing (living people)
20th-century South Korean women